The Kryvyi Rih tramway network is part of the public transport system of Kryvyi Rih, city in Ukraine. The tram network serves as the backbone of the transit system, serving as part of the Kryvyi Rih Metrotram system.

In operation since 1935, the Kryvyi Rih tram network is one of world's largest tram networks, operating on 88.1 kilometres of total route. As of 2014, it was composed of 13 lines. The system is operated by the Kryvyi Rih City Council under the supervision of the city community.

On May 1, 2021 Kryvyi Rih became the first city in Ukraine to introduce free travel in public transport for its citizens. In order not to pay for municipal transport one must show a special electronic "Kryvyi Rih Citier Card".

On April 27, 2022 free travel in Kryvyi Rih became available to all tram, trolleybus and the Metro passengers.

Network

Rolling stock

Current fleet

See also

Kryvyi Rih Metrotram
List of town tramway systems in Europe

References

External links

Kryvyi Rih
Transport in Kryvyi Rih
Tourist attractions in Kryvyi Rih
Metre gauge railways in Ukraine
Kryvyi Rih